Wilberforce is a neighborhood in Freetown, Sierra Leone. It is home to the Wilberforce military barracks, one of the largest in the country and the main barracks of the Sierra Leone military.

Wilberforce is also home to several foreign embassies, including China, Gambia, Germany, Liberia, Lebanon, Libya, Syria, and Austria.

History
Wilberforce was founded in 1810 to provide accommodation for  liberated African recaptives, who had been brought to Freetown by the British Royal Navy West Africa Squadron. The descendants of these liberated Africans, (along with the Jamaican Maroons and Nova Scotians) are the  Creole people.  The settlement was formerly known as Cabenda.

Notable People from Wilberforce, Sierra Leone
Isaac Wallace-Johnson, political activist during the independence era.
John 'Johnny' Taylor: Creole trader killed during Sierra Leone's Hut Tax War of 1898

References

External links
http://www.wilberforcelecturetrust.co.uk/index.php/lectures/transcript/30/?keepThis=true&TB_iframe=true&height=550&width=550
List of embassies in Freetown
 United Nations document on UNAMSIL

Wilberforce
Diplomatic districts
Sierra Leone Liberated African villages
Populated places established by Sierra Leone Creoles